USS Eureka was a steamer captured by the Union Navy during the American Civil War. She was used by the Union Navy as a gunboat in support of the Union Navy blockade of Confederate waterways.

Service history 

For the next 2½ years, Eureka patrolled the Potomac and Rappahannock rivers and their tributaries, to prevent the passage of people and commerce between the Confederates in Virginia and their sympathizers in Maryland. Her shallow draft made her ideal for this duty, essential to controlling the flow of intelligence and supplies to the South. Inactive after March 1865, Eureka was sold at Washington, D.C., 15 September 1865.

References 

Ships of the Union Navy
American Civil War patrol vessels of the United States
Gunboats of the United States Navy
Steamships of the United States Navy